The Yading Skyrun is an international skyrunning competition held for the first time in 2016. It runs every year in Yading (China) at the end of April or beginning of May. The race is valid for the Skyrunner World Series.

Races
 Yading Skyrun, a SkyRace (29 km / 2345 m elevation)
 Yading Kora Ultra, an Ultra SkyMarathon (46 km / 2955 m elevation)
 Yading VK, a Vertical Kilometer (7 km / 1072 m elevation)

Yading Skyrun

Yading Kora Ultra

Yading VK

See also 
 Skyrunner World Series

References

External links 
 Official web site

Skyrunning competitions
Skyrunner World Series
Athletics competitions in China
Sport in Sichuan